Madan-e Zirab (also Romanized as Ma‘dan-e Zīrāb) is a village in Sorkhkola Rural District, in the Central District of Savadkuh County, Mazandaran Province, Iran. At the 2006 census, its population was 71, in 20 families.

References 

Populated places in Savadkuh County